Nicholaes DeMeyer (DeMayer or Meyer) (c. July 10, 1635 – March 19, 1691) was the ninth mayor of New York City, in the English colony of New York. He was appointed mayor by Governor Edmund Andros on October 14, 1676, and served until 1677.

DeMayer was from Hamburg. He is known to have been married twice, once to Lydia Van Dyck and once to Sarah Kellnar. At one time, DeMayer was described as "the second-wealthiest man in the New Netherlands".

DeMayer's father in law, Hendrick Van Dyke, is notable for starting the Peach Tree War by shooting a Native American woman picking peaches on his property. Nicholas also participated in this war.

Due to the various means of spelling his name, and the non-standard bookkeeping practices of the time, DeMayer's name has been found in many forms:

Nicholaes DeMeyer
Nicholas de Meyer
Nicholas de Meyer Van Holstein
Nicholas Meyer Van Hamborg
Nicholas DeMayer
Nicholas Meyer
Nicholas DeMeirt
Nicholas Demeyrt
N.D. Meijer
Nicholas Meyers

References

 World Family Tree, Broderbund Software, Inc. Vol 7, Ed 1, p. 4380
 Abstracts of Wills, Vol 1, 1665 – 1707, p. 203. 
 J.H. Innes, New Amsterdam and Its People. New York: Charles Scribner's Sons, 1902. pages 148, 170–1, 308.
 Martha J. Lamb. History of the City of New York. Cornell University,  Making of America Books. pages 277, 384.
 James Riker. Revised History of Harlem (City of New York): Its Origin and Early Annals.
 Frank Moss. The American Metropolis from Knickerbocker Days to the Present Time; New York City Life in All Its Various Phases, p. 47, 120, 354.
 Henry W. Lanier. A Century of Banking in New York, 1822–1922, p. 79, 84.
 "Progress of New York in a Century, 1776–1876." Address before the New York Historical Society, December 7, 1875, p. 69–71.
 Murray Hoffman. Treatise upon the Estate and Rights of the Corporation of the city of New York, as Proprietors, p. 115.
 E. B. O'Callaghan, The Documentary History of the State of New York, etc., p. 150, 230.
 John R. Brodhead, History of the State of New York, pp. 271, 462, 628, 629, 669.
 E. B. O'Callaghan, History of New Netherland, pp. 520, 528, 530.
 Mary L. Booth, History of the City of New York, pp. IV, 171, 198.

1630s births
1691 deaths
American people of Dutch descent
People of New Netherland
German emigrants to the Thirteen Colonies